Andrew X. Pham is a Vietnamese-born American author who is the founder of Spoonwiz.

Extended biography
Born in Phan Thiet in 1967, Pham's father Thong was a teacher and his mother a laundress. Pham had two sisters, Chi and Kay, and three younger brothers Huy, Tien, and Hien.

During the Vietnam War, Thong worked for the South Vietnamese Army in its propaganda department.  He was eventually captured by the Vietcong and sent to Minh Luong Prison re-education camp for several months. After Thong's release, the family decided to flee by boat to Malaysia.  As the boat was falling apart at sea they were rescued by an Indonesian freighter, which brought them to Indonesia.

Pham's family spent 18 months in a refugee camp in Jakarta.  The First Baptist Church of Shreveport, Louisiana flew the Pham family to Louisiana and sponsored them there. Nine months later, the Pham family relocated to San Jose, California. After finishing high school, Pham attended UCLA to study engineering. 

During this period Chi, who had left home years earlier, returned as a transgender male with the name Minh. After several months, Minh committed suicide. His tragic death was the catalyst for Pham's journey to Vietnam and self-discovery.  After Minh's death, Pham decided to take a trip to the Pacific Northwest and then to Vietnam. He chronicled this journey in his book, Catfish and Mandala: A Two-Wheeled Voyage Through the Landscape and Memory of Vietnam.

Works
 (1999)
 (2008)

Awards
1999 Kiriyama Pacific Rim Book Prize for Catfish and Mandala (memoir)
2000 Whiting Award
2009 Guggenheim Fellowship

References

External links
 https://www.andrewxpham.com/, official website.
 Andrew X Pham, author's Facebook fan page.
 Profile at The Whiting Foundation
 Excerpt from The Eaves of Heaven at BookBrowse

Vietnamese emigrants to the United States
Living people
1967 births
American writers of Vietnamese descent